The Hunt for Red October is a 1990 video game based on the 1990 film The Hunt for Red October. It was developed by Images Software and released by Grandslam Interactive Ltd. for the Amiga, Amstrad CPC, Atari ST, Commodore 64, ZX Spectrum, and for DOS.

Gameplay
The game features five action sequences including jumping from a helicopter and navigating submarines through deep channels and avoiding various obstacles.

References

External links

The Hunt for Red October - Based on the Movie on the Amiga at the Hall of Light (HOL)

1990 video games
Amiga games
Amstrad CPC games
Atari ST games
Commodore 64 games
DOS games
ZX Spectrum games
Submarine simulation video games
Cold War video games
Video games based on films
Video games based on The Hunt for Red October
Video games based on adaptations
Video games scored by Allister Brimble
Video games developed in the United Kingdom
Single-player video games
Side-scrolling video games